The 1976–77 NBA season was the Braves seventh season in the NBA. The Braves were purchased by John Y. Brown, Jr., the former owner of the Kentucky Colonels in the now defunct American Basketball Association for $6.2 million.  As part of an agreement with the Braves' former owner, Paul Snyder, Brown would give Snyder money received in player deals to reduce the purchase price. The sell-off began shortly after the season, as the Braves sold newly acquired Moses Malone. Malone was acquired in a trade with the Portland Trail Blazers after the ABA dispersal draft. Malone was now off to the Houston Rockets. The selling of players continued into the season as Bob McAdoo was sold to the New York Knicks. While the deals helped Brown pay virtually nothing for the franchise, it turned a promising franchise into a rebuilding one. Attendance fell off as the Braves finished in 4th place with a 30–52 record. The only spotlight was rookie Adrian Dantley, who captured Rookie of the Year honors with 20.3 points per game. However Dantley himself was traded following the season to the Indiana Pacers for Billy Knight.

Offseason
Coach Ramsay had been hired in 1972 to a three-year contract. He served the 1975–76 season on a one-year extension.  His contract was not renewed.  Ramsay had guided the Braves to the playoffs three years in a row after enduring a 21–61 season, accumulating a 158–170 overall record. Local reports noted a personality conflict with owner Snyder.  The Braves promoted assistant coach Tates Locke and signed him to a two-year contract.

Snyder threatened to sell the Braves if they did not sell 5,000 season tickets by June 12, 1976.  However the season ticket drive by the Chamber of Commerce and other civic groups only resulted in 2,552 sales by the deadline date.  In June 1976, Diplomat Hotel owner Irving Cowan obtained an option to purchase the Braves for $6.1 million, and planned to bring them to South Florida and the Hollywood Sportatorium.  Pledges of more than 8,000 season tickets were received in Florida.  On June 15, Snyder announced the planned sale.  The Wall Street Journal estimated the sale price to be in the $7–8 million range.  However, the next day the city of Buffalo sued the Braves for breach of contract and sought a restraining order preventing the move.  The suit was filed in New York Supreme Court for seeking $10 million from the Braves and the NBA for breaking a promise to sign a new 15-year lease.  Another suit was filed as an anti-trust case in United States district court against the rest of the NBA seeking $48 million in damages in the event of a move.  The anti-trust case alleged that the move was an attempt to eliminate competition against a future Toronto NBA franchise and to discourage expansion of the American Basketball Association to southern Florida.  The damages arose as treble damages related to a March 1 promise to sign a lease.  Although Cowan claimed the move would still take place, the effort collapsed under the weight of the lawsuit and the Braves ended up signing a new lease with the city of Buffalo.  In July, the Braves signed a new lease with the city for the Memorial Auditorium with the understanding that there was an ongoing effort to sell the team to local interests. The signing of the lease settled the lawsuits.

NBA Draft

ABA Dispersal Draft
The American Basketball Association joined the NBA with the ABA–NBA merger in 1976. Of the teams remaining in the ABA, four joined the NBA.  The remaining two ABA teams that did not join the NBA, the Kentucky Colonels and the Spirits of St. Louis, had their players assigned to a dispersal draft for draft purposes.

Roster
{| class="toccolours" style="font-size: 95%; width: 100%;"
|-
! colspan="2" style="background-color: #E23B45;  color: #FFFFFF; text-align: center;" | Buffalo Braves 1976–77 roster
|- style="background-color: #106BB4; color: #FFFFFF;   text-align: center;"
! Players !! Coaches
|-
| valign="top" |
{| class="sortable" style="background:transparent; margin:0px; width:100%;"
! Pos. !! # !! Nat. !! Name !! Ht. !! Wt. !! From
|-

Roster Notes
 Center Moses Malone played in only 2 games before being traded to the Houston Rockets in October.
 Guard Johnny Neumann and forward Clyde Mayes played in only 4 games and 2 games respectively before being waived in November.
 Centers Bob McAdoo & Tom McMillen were traded to the New York Knicks and guard Jim Price was traded to the Denver Nuggets in December.
 Forward Zaid Abdul-Aziz played in 22 games before being waived in January.
 Guard Claude Terry played in 33 games before he was purchased by the Atlanta Hawks in February.

Regular season

Season standings

Record vs. opponents

Season Schedule

source

Player stats

Awards and honors
 Ernie DiGregorio, Led NBA, Free Throw Percentage, .945

Transactions
The Braves sent Ken Charles and Dick Gibbs and cash to the Atlanta Hawks for Tom Van Arsdale. Van Arsdale never played for the Braves who traded him in August to the Phoenix Suns for a 1977 NBA Draft 2nd round pick.

The Braves were involved in the following transactions during the 1976–77 season.

Coaching Change

Trades

Free agents

Additions

Subtractions

References

 Braves on Database Basketball
 Braves on Basketball Reference

Buffalo Braves seasons
Buffalo
Buffalo
Buffalo